The 2014–15 Football League One (referred to as the Sky Bet League One for sponsorship reasons) was the eleventh season of the Football League One under its current title and the twenty-second season under its current league division format. The season began on 9 August 2014.

Bristol City won the league to return to the Championship after a two-year absence. They were unbeaten for the first 16 matches of the season and also finished with the best goal difference and best defence. MK Dons pipped Preston North End to 2nd place on the last day of the season after the Lancashire club lost at Colchester. But Preston were eventually promoted via the playoffs, defeating Chesterfield and Swindon 4–0 (on aggregate) and 4–0 respectively.

At the other end of the table, Yeovil Town followed their relegation from the Championship the previous season with another relegation. Leyton Orient were relegated after having contested the playoff final in 2013–14 (which they lost to Rotherham on penalties after being 2–0 up), and Crawley and Notts County were the final teams relegated to League Two for the 2015–16 season.

Changes from last season

Team changes

The following teams have changed division since the 2013–14 season.

To League One
Promoted from League Two
Chesterfield
Scunthorpe United
Rochdale
Fleetwood Town

Relegated from Championship
 Doncaster Rovers
 Barnsley
 Yeovil Town

From League One
Relegated to League Two
Tranmere Rovers
Carlisle United
Shrewsbury Town
Stevenage
Promoted to Championship
Wolverhampton Wanderers
Brentford
Rotherham United

Team overview

Stadia and locations

Managerial changes

League table

Play-offs

Results

Top scorers

References 

 
EFL League One seasons
2014–15 Football League
3
Eng